Seeds is a solo studio album by American singer Georgia Anne Muldrow. It was released via SomeOthaShip Connect on March 27, 2012. The album is entirely produced by Madlib.

The single of the same name was released on February 14, 2012.

Critical reception

At Metacritic, which assigns a weighted average score out of 100 to reviews from mainstream critics, the album received an average score of 79, based on 11 reviews, indicating "generally favorable reviews".

Andy Kellman of AllMusic gave the album 4 out of 5 stars, calling it "Muldrow's most focused, funkiest, and (somewhat ironically) personal release to date." Matt Bauer of Exclaim! said, "Seeds strikes the perfect balance, as Madlib's thickly layered funk and soul samples and cabinet rocking beats pair with Muldrow's gloriously off-kilter vocals and free-form song structures to make this her most satisfying release to date."

AllMusic included it on the "Favorite R&B Albums of 2012" list. Exclaim! placed it at number 31 on the "Top 50 Albums of the Year" list. Rhapsody placed it at number 7 on the "Top 20 R&B Albums of 2012" list.

Track listing

Personnel
Credits adapted from liner notes.

 Georgia Anne Muldrow – vocals
 Madlib – production
 Declaime – vocals (10), executive production
 Rickie Byars Beckwith – executive production
 Jay Devonish – executive production
 DJ Romes – mastering
 Charles Sicuso – photography

References

External links
 

2012 albums
Albums produced by Madlib
Contemporary R&B albums by American artists
Funk albums by American artists
Soul albums by American artists